Goldsmiths' Hall is a Grade I listed building at the junction of Foster Lane and Gresham Street in the City of London. It has served as an assay office and the headquarters of London's goldsmith guild, the Worshipful Company of Goldsmiths, one of the livery companies of the City of London. The company has been based at this location since 1339, the present building being their third hall on the site.

History 
Little is known about the first hall. It was rebuilt in 1407 by Drugo Barentyn, a goldsmith who served twice as Lord Mayor of London.

The second hall was built circa 1634–36. In 1665, Samuel Pepys viewed the funeral of Sir Thomas Vyner from Goldsmiths' Hall. Pepys wore his best silk suit for the occasion, but the hall was so full of people that he left for Paternoster Square to order a new, ordinary silk suit. The hall was restored after the Great Fire of London in 1666 and eventually demolished in the late 1820s.

The third and present hall was designed by Philip Hardwick, who commissioned sculptor Samuel Nixon (sculptor). Marble statues by Samuel Nixon of children representing the Four Seasons stand on pedestals on the lower flight of the grand staircase, which The Gentleman's Magazine described as “a work of the highest merit ... such beautiful personifications.” The hall is entirely detached and occupies an entire block. Despite its great size, it is the second largest livery hall after the Worshipful Company of Plaisterers' Plaisterers Hall at One London Wall. The Illustrated London News declared “’The Goldsmiths’ is the most magnificent of all the Halls of the City of London.” Those present at the opening dinner in 1835 included the Duke of Wellington and Robert Peel.

In 1941 a bomb exploded in its southwest corner, but  the building largely survived and was restored after the Second World War. 

From time to time, the Master and Wardens provide for open days to visit Goldsmiths' Hall.

References

External links
 The Goldsmiths' Company

1339 establishments in England
Buildings and structures completed in 1835
Grade I listed buildings in the City of London
Grade I listed livery halls
Livery halls
Philip Hardwick buildings